Rockland, also known as Verdier Plantation, Schley Farm and Knode House, was built by James Verdier between 1771 and 1785 near Shepherdstown, West Virginia.  Verdier was a Huguenot, the son of a French silk weaver, who married Lady Susanna Monei and came to North America to escape religious persecution.  In America he became a tanner, with tanneries in Martinsburg, West Virginia, Sharpsburg, Maryland and Shepherdstown. His children founded Verdiersville, Virginia after his death.  The older portion of the house is stone masonry.  A brick Victorian style addition was built in 1897.

Built largely of limestone, the two-story, five-bay center hall house has sandstone accents. A basement kitchen is accessed by a door in the gable end. The interior was remodeled with Greek Revival detailing in the nineteenth century.

References

French-American culture in West Virginia
Historic districts in Jefferson County, West Virginia
Houses completed in 1785
Houses completed in 1897
Houses in Jefferson County, West Virginia
Houses on the National Register of Historic Places in West Virginia
Huguenot history in the United States
National Register of Historic Places in Jefferson County, West Virginia
Stone houses in West Virginia
Vernacular architecture in West Virginia
Victorian architecture in West Virginia
Historic districts on the National Register of Historic Places in West Virginia